This is a list of known industry trade groups located in Ukraine.

Ukrainian Association of Press Publishers, press publishing
Independent Regional Publishers of Ukraine, press publishing
National Journalists Society of Ukraine, journalism
National Writers Society of Ukraine, writing
National [Visual] Artists Society of Ukraine, visual art
Ukrainian Union of Industrialists and Entrepreneurs, business
All-Ukrainian association of publishers and distributors of press, press publishing
All-Ukrainian Association of Museums, museum
Ukrainian Red Cross Society, medicine
Lawyers Union of Ukraine
Geologists Society of Ukraine
Christian Writers Society of Ukraine
Fishermen Community of Ukraine
Employers Federation of Ukraine
Ukrainian Union of NSMEP participants
Ukraine Nature Conservation Society
Ukrainian Notary Chamber
Ukrainian Builders Association (UBA)
Ukrainian Association of Weapon Owners

References 

 
Industry trade groups
Ukraine